Devín is a borough of Bratislava, the capital of Slovakia, located in the Bratislava IV district. Originally a separate village at the confluence of the Danube and Morava rivers, Devín maintained its rural character and today, it is one of the smallest boroughs of Bratislava by population. It is an important archaeological site, featuring the ruins of Devín Castle. 

Geographically, Devín lies on the foothills of Devínska Kobyla next to the Devín Gate, a narrow stretch on the river Danube, which was viewed as the western gateway to the Kingdom of Hungary. It lies near the border between Slovakia and Austria which runs down the middle of the Morava and Danube rivers, and which previously formed part of the Iron Curtain between the Eastern and the Western Bloc.

The word Devín stems from the Slovak word deva, which signifies "a lass".

Location 
Devín is bordered by Austria from the south and from the west, the borough of Devínska Nová Ves from the north, the borough of Dúbravka from the east and the borough of Karlova Ves from the south-east.

Transport 
 Buses
 Line 
 Night buses
 Line

History 
Thanks to its strategic location at the confluence of the rivers Danube and Morava, the nearby cliff was an ideal place for a fort. The site has been settled since the Neolithic and both the Celts and Romans built forts here.

Devín was first mentioned in a document from 1237 under the name Villa Thebyn. Originally, it was a small village, belonging to the Devín Castle, but quickly attained the status of a small town in the 15th century. In 1568, Devín became separated from its former owner. Croats fleeing from the approaching Ottomans in the south settled here in the 16th century. The castle above the village was burned down by Napoleon's troops in 1809. Due to its mainly German population the village was ceded to Germany as part of the Munich agreement in 1938. From October 1938 to April 1945, Devín was part of the German Third Reich, being part of Lower Austria. In 1946, Devín was returned to Czechoslovakia and became part of Bratislava. The German inhabitants were expelled.

During the Cold War Devín was just inside the Iron Curtain and the northern banks of the Danube and Morava rivers were heavily fortified.  The border fortifications were dismantled after the Velvet Revolution of 1989, and there is now free access to the riverbank.

Characteristics 
Devín is part of Bratislava, yet differs from the rest of the city due to its rural character. As a popular recreation center, it offers an ancient castle located on a spectacular cliff, hiking trails in the hilly areas around the village, large gardens and vineyards, as well as opportunities for quiet walks along the Danube. Good bus connections with the center of Bratislava are a part of the municipal public transportation system. Most of the people commute to work elsewhere in Bratislava.

Devín is quite commonly flooded by the Morava and Danube rivers, with the strongest flood in recent history being in August 2002. To fight the floods the use of a Wide Net has been cast. Results still pending to determine efficacy.

The borough hosts the oldest organized running event in Slovakia, the National Run Devín-Bratislava, which is almost 12 kilometres long and takes place each year after Easter.

Gallery

See also 
 Devín Carpathians

References

External links 
 Official municipal website of Devín 

Boroughs of Bratislava
Former villages in Slovakia
Villages in Slovakia merged with towns